Giovanni Pasquale (born 5 January 1982) is an Italian football coach and former professional player who plays as a full-back. He is the manager-player for the amateur side ASD Venaria Reale.

Career

Inter
Pasquale started his career at Internazionale. Due to Francesco Coco's performance, he gained a place in first team. In January 2003, he signed a new contract for the club along with Nicola Beati and Obafemi Martins.

After the signing of Giuseppe Favalli, he was out-favored by coach Roberto Mancini and sent on loan to Siena and Parma.

Livorno
Following Coco's failure to make a permanent move and subsequently returning to Internazionale, Livorno signed Pasquale in a co-ownership deal, for €750,000. The co-ownership deal turned to a permanent one a year later, for €400,000. He was a regular player, but after the team was relegated again in June 2008, he was sold to Udinese, which qualified to the 2008–09 UEFA Cup.

Udinese
Although Udinese failed to qualify again for the UEFA Cup, the team signed Pasquale permanently from by-then Serie B promotion playoffs winner Livorno in June 2009, where he again played regularly, but he eventually became Aleksandar Luković's backup in the left-back position during the 2009–10 season, and played a few matches as left midfielder. But, in January, the team's formation was changed, in which Luković became centre-back and Pasquale became left-back again, since the match against Napoli on 7 February.

In 2010–11 season, he became backup to Pablo Armero, playing as a wing-back in a new 3–5–2 formation.

2011–12
After Udinese sold a vast number of players, the formation was again changed against Arsenal in 2011–12 UEFA Champions League playoffs round, with Armero as left midfielder and Neuton as new left-back. Pasquale played twice as substitute. However, he was excluded from the 25-men squad to the 2011–12 UEFA Europa League.

Due to the exclusion from the European matches, he was a starter in the 2011–12 Serie A's first round, with Neuton as backup and Armero ailing in Udinese's landmark 3–5–2 formation, as the squad was changed to become more competitive in domestic and international competitions.

On 1 February 2012, Pasquale was re-instated to the Europa League squad. He played the first knock-out round as left winger in the 3–5–1–1 formation, with Armero moving to the attacking midfielder role.

In October 2012, he signed a new contract which would last until 30 June 2016, adding three more years to his previous contract.

Loan to Torino
In August 2013, he was loaned to Torino after original signing Andrea Dossena failed his medical tests with the club. He debuted as a final substitute against Milan on 14 September 2013, conceding a penalty in stoppage time which gave Milan the opportunity to draw the game, which ended 2–2. Originally a backup player, he was inserted into the starting lineup after left-back Danilo D'Ambrosio was frozen out of the squad following a contract dispute.

However, his uninspiring performances soon led to him being dropped in favour of Salvatore Masiello, who was injured while warming up before the derby in February 2014 with Juventus. In the same month, Pasquale was also injured, prematurely ending his season with just 13 appearances.

Career statistics

Club
As of 24 August 2011

References

External links
 archivio.inter.it
 FIGC 
 Profile at La Gazzetta dello Sport 
 Profile at Football.it 

Living people
1982 births
People from Venaria Reale
Footballers from Piedmont
Italian footballers
Association football fullbacks
Italy under-21 international footballers
Inter Milan players
A.C.N. Siena 1904 players
Parma Calcio 1913 players
U.S. Livorno 1915 players
Udinese Calcio players
Torino F.C. players
Serie A players
Italian football managers
Sportspeople from the Metropolitan City of Turin